Belmont Stadium was a greyhound racing stadium in Broomside Lane, Belmont, County Durham.

Origins
The track was constructed on the south side of Broomside Lane and east of the cemetery in 1940.

Opening
Greyhound racing started on Saturday 13 July 1940, serving as entertainment for the mining community from Broomside Colliery and the Carrville residents.

History
The racing was independent (not affiliated to the National Greyhound Racing Club). Race distances included 290 yards and a totalisator was in operation. The stadium suffered temporary closures during the war.  In 1954 the track was the inspiration for a 1954 film called The Gay Dog.

Closure
The stadium continued to trade until 1969 before closing and being turned into housing.

Totalisator Returns

References

Defunct greyhound racing venues in the United Kingdom